4607 Seilandfarm, provisional designation , is a rare-type binary asteroid from the inner regions of the asteroid belt, approximately 7 kilometers in diameter.

It was discovered on 25 November 1987, by Japanese amateur astronomers Kin Endate and Kazuro Watanabe at Kitami Observatory on the Japanese island of Hokkaidō. It was named for a dairy and cattle farm with the same name, located near the Japanese city of Kitami.

Classification and orbit 

Seilandfarm orbits the Sun in the inner main-belt at a distance of 2.2–2.3 AU once every 3 years and 5 months (1,244 days). Its orbit has an eccentricity of 0.02 and an inclination of 2° with respect to the ecliptic.

The body's observation arc begins with its official discovery observation at Kitami.

Binary system

Primary 

On the SMASS taxonomic scheme, Seilandfarm is classified as a rare and reddish L-type asteroid.

According to the survey carried out by NASA's Wide-field Infrared Survey Explorer with its NEOWISE mission, Seilandfarm measures between 6.3 and 7.5 and kilometers in diameter, and its surface has a corresponding albedo between 0.178 and 0.279, while the Collaborative Asteroid Lightcurve Link assumes a standard albedo for stony asteroids of 0.20 and calculates a diameter of 7.1 kilometers, in agreement with the results obtained by the space-based observations.

In February 2009 and September 2014, three rotational lightcurves were obtained from photometric observations by astronomers Donald P. Pray and Petr Pravec at the U.S. Carbuncle and the Czech Ondřejov Observatory, respectively.

Moon 

During the photometric observations in February 2009, it was discovered that Seilandfarm is in fact a binary system. Its minor-planet moon has an orbital period of 31.6 hours. Based on mutual eclipse/occultation events, the satellite is thought to be at least 29% the size of Seilandfarm, which translates into a diameter of approximately 2 kilometers or more.

Naming 

This minor planet was named for Seilandfarm, a 50-hectare dairy and cattle farm, located in a hilly terrain, near the Japanese city of Kitami and not far from the observatory where this minor planet was discovered (also see 3785 Kitami). The farm was established by Akio Seino in 1942, and is now operated by four members of the Seino family. The approved naming citation was published by the Minor Planet Center on 14 July 1992.

Notes

References

External links 
 Asteroids with Satellites, Robert Johnston, johnstonsarchive.net
 Asteroid Lightcurve Database (LCDB), query form (info )
 Dictionary of Minor Planet Names, Google books
 Asteroids and comets rotation curves, CdR – Observatoire de Genève, Raoul Behrend
 Discovery Circumstances: Numbered Minor Planets (1)-(5000) – Minor Planet Center
 
 

004607
Discoveries by Kin Endate
Discoveries by Kazuro Watanabe
Named minor planets
004607
004607
19871125